Složna braća is a 1995 Serbian television comedy miniseries. Created and written by Nele Karajlić and directed by Oleg Novković, Karajlić, and Nikola Pejaković the series achieved sizable popularity.

Overview
Taking place just after the end of the Bosnian War, the series is mostly set in the Halimić brothers owned kafana named Složna braća, located on a small patch of UN-controlled territory (covering 0.0675% of the country's territory, i.e. 564 m2) not claimed by any of the three warring sides. Serbs, Bosniaks, and Croats, otherwise very hostile to each other following a ferocious civil war, regularly visit the said kafana in no man's land in order to arrange mutual black market activities (weapons and food trade, oil and cigarette smuggling, etc.).

When the word gets around about an important weapons shipment passing through the territory that can supposedly completely change the division of power in the Balkans, the place becomes a lively hub of deal-making and skulduggery.

Cast

Main 
Vladimir "Čobi" Savčić as Fikret "Fiko" Halimić
Davor Dujmović as Mustafa "Mute" Halimić
Goran Sultanović as Adnan "Čenga" Čengić
Živojin Milenković as Vojo Kecman
Zoran Cvijanović as Zoran "Kiza" Valuta
Nele Karajlić as Miljenko Ćutuk
Petar Božović as Manjina Liska
Nataša Ninković as Srebrenka
Nikola Pejaković as Čorba
Seka Sablić as Milena
Darko Ostojić as Mehmed "Memara" Halimić and Nana
Mirsad Tuka as Sabe

Production
The series was shot from June until September 1995, mostly in RTS' Košutnjak studios in Filmski Grad.

Reception
The series premiered on Friday, 5 January 1996 in prime time on RTS, achieving high viewership rates in FR Yugoslavia.

References

External links 
 

Serbian comedy television series
Radio Television of Serbia original programming
1995 Serbian television series debuts
1995 Serbian television series endings
Serbian-language television shows
1990s Serbian television series